"Marjorie" (stylized in all lowercase) is a song by American singer-songwriter Taylor Swift. It is the thirteenth song from her ninth studio album Evermore (2020), which was released on December 11, 2020, through Republic Records.

As a tribute to Swift's late grandmother and opera singer Marjorie Finlay, the song features bits of advice that Finlay offered to her granddaughter and touches on Swift's guilt over not knowing her maternal grandmother to the fullest. It incorporates slow-burning synthesizers, strings, and samples of Finlay's operatic vocals. Upon release of Evermore, "Marjorie" was met with widespread critical acclaim, with praise for its emotion, lyricism, and production. Many critics selected the song as a highlight on Evermore and dubbed it one of Swift's most poignant songs. Commercially, "Marjorie" reached number 16 on the Billboard Hot Rock & Alternative Songs chart, and entered various other charts globally. Swift included the song on the set list of the Eras Tour (2023).

Background and composition

Prior to releasing her ninth studio album, Evermore, Swift mentioned that one of its songs would be about her maternal grandmother. The song and its lyric video were both released on December 11, 2020, as the thirteenth track on the album. The song is a tribute to her maternal grandmother, Marjorie Finlay, who was born in Memphis, Tennessee, on October 5, 1928, and died on June 1, 2003, in Reading, Pennsylvania. Finlay inspired Swift to pursue a musical career.

The song's lyrics are structured like chants, composed of life lessons Swift learned from Finlay, including: "Never be so kind, you forget to be clever/ Never be so clever, you forget to be kind". The song also depicts the grief and guilt Swift felt over the memory of her grandmother. The song's production is characterized by buzzing synths, strings, drone, pulse, cello, and pulsing keyboard arrangement, ending with an elegant outro. "Marjorie" also samples Finlay's soprano as backing vocals and is a sister song to "Epiphany", the thirteenth track on Swift's eighth studio album Folklore about Swift's paternal grandfather, Dean.

Writing and production
"Marjorie" was the precursor to "Peace", the fifteenth track on Folklore; the drone in "Peace" is a sample of the drone in the bridge of "Marjorie". The backing rhythm of "Marjorie" was composed from an "Allovers Hi-Hat Generator", a software created by Minnesotan producer Ryan Olson that takes any sound and splits them into identifiable samples, reorganizing the samples in randomized musical patterns. Aaron Dessner, who co-wrote and produced the song, picked his favorite patterns, looped them, and developed them into an instrumental track. Swift wrote "Marjorie" to Dessner's track, and Swift provided Dessner with Finlay's old opera recordings, which he sampled on the final portion of the song.

Reception
"Marjorie" received critical acclaim. The A.V. Club critic Annie Zaleski lauded "Marjorie" for its heart-wrenching lyricism and "anguished" production, and named it one of Swift's best songs to date. NME writer Hannah Mylrea thought that the song effectively depicts the grief and the complex guilt that is tied with it. Madeline Crone of American Songwriter praised the "lofty" lyrics paying tribute to Finlay and the "vivid imagery" it evokes. She found its outro "ethereal", aided by Finlay's operatic vocals. Maura Johnston, writing for Entertainment Weekly, opined that the song's whirring synthesizers, strings, and Finlay's "fluttery" soprano add life to Swift's emotional vocals. Chris Willman of Variety claimed that "Marjorie" will "leave a dry eye only in houses that have never known death", and the faint audio samples of Finlay's vocals is the "pièce de résistance" of the song's poignancy.

Paste's Ellen Johnson commended the song as one of Swift's all-time best songs, and she wrote that her "hard-won wisdom" in the song makes it the most representing track of what Evermore is—"a peacefully intimate record". In his review of Evermore, Patrick Ryan of USA Today highlighted "Marjorie" as a "heart-rending tribute". Rolling Stone writer Claire Shaffer dubbed "Marjorie" the centerpiece of Evermore—a "brilliant and devastating piece of songcraft, an instant classic in the Swift canon"—and compared it to Swift's 2012 single "Ronan", praising the singer's skills in writing a eulogy. Shaffer added that she could not think of another song that "so perfectly captures the delayed tragedy of losing a loved one when you're too young to see their full worth."

Stephen Erlwine of AllMusic opined that Evermore reaches its crescendo on "Marjorie", where the "delicately shifting arrangement —more electronic than acoustic", "underscores" Swift's grief instead of heightening it. Stereogums Tom Breihan commented that Swift ruminates on "Marjorie" the type of loss and regret that "you can only really feel when someone dies", over a soft, thumping synthesizer. Jon Pareles of The New York Times praised the song's instrumentation—"glimmering" electronic production enriched by subtle pizzicato strings. Punch Liwanag of the Manila Bulletin called the song a "beautifully emotional ballad." Music journalist Rob Sheffield placed it ninth on his 2021 ranking of all the 199 songs in Swift's discography.

Commercial performance
In the United States, "Marjorie" debuted and peaked at number 75 on the Billboard Hot 100. The song also peaked at number 16 on the Hot Rock & Alternative Songs chart, staying for three weeks, and it peaked at number 56 on the Rolling Stone Top 100 chart. Internationally, it reached number 66 on the Billboard Global 200 and number 129 on the Global 200 Excluding US chart. Elsewhere, the song peaked at number 57 on Australia's ARIA Singles Chart, 48 on the Canadian Hot 100, and number 94 on the UK Streaming Chart.

Lyric video
A lyric video was released along with the song on December 11, 2020. The video includes photos and video clips of Finlay, and in one scene, she is wearing a Jackie O-style dress while boarding a plane. She is also seen exploring ruins and playing the piano with Swift.

Credits and personnel
Credits adapted from Pitchfork:

 Taylor Swift − lead vocals, songwriter
 Aaron Dessner − producer, songwriter, recorder, drum machine programming, drone, synth bass, piano, acoustic guitar
 Justin Vernon – backing vocals, prophet-5
 Marjorie Finlay – backing vocals
 Jonathan Low − vocal recorder, mixer
 Bryce Dessner – orchestrator
 Greg Calbi – masterer
 Steve Fallone – masterer
 Bryan Devendorf – percussion, drum machine programmer
 Ryan Olson – Allovers Hi-Hat Generator, recorder
 Jason Treuting – chord stick, percussion
 Justin McAlister – vermona pulse
 Yuki Numata Resnick – violin
 Clarice Jensen – cello

Charts

References

2020 songs
2020s ballads
Taylor Swift songs
Commemoration songs
Songs written by Taylor Swift
Songs written by Aaron Dessner
Song recordings produced by Aaron Dessner
American electronic songs
American synth-pop songs